Digital LG Quiz is a Philippine television quiz show broadcast by GMA Network. Hosted by Paolo Bediones and Regine Tolentino, it premiered in 1999. The show was reformatted and retitled as Digital LG Challenge in 2003, with Bediones and Bianca Araneta as the hosts. The show concluded in 2004.

Format

A high school sends a representative (and an alternative), either a sophomore or a junior to the television program. The alternative would only come to play if the original contestant would not be able to make it on the school's first appearance each season. For example, if the original contestant qualified for the monthly final, but the contestant can't be available, the school forfeits its monthly final spot. But if the school sends its alternate and qualifies for the monthly final, but the original becomes available for the monthly final, the alternate would be the one that will represent the school. The season runs from October to July.

In order to be the season's champion, a contender must qualify for the monthly and quarterly finals, and to win in the quarterly finals.

In the weekly preliminary rounds, four schools would be represented (the manner of selection depends on the available schedule). The contender with the highest points at the end of the program wins the weekly final. Two more weekly preliminary rounds will be held, and on the fourth week, a monthly final will be held, where the three weekly champions qualify directly, along with the second-placer with the highest total points (as the wildcard).

If there are two contenders with the same number of points for the wildcard spot, a written test will be administered (first season) or the contender with the higher number of buzz-ins (succeeding seasons) would qualify.

The process will be repeated until there are three monthly champions. On the fourth month, the three monthly champions qualify directly to the quarterfinals, along with the second-placer with the highest total points earned in the monthly finals (as a wild card) to contest for a spot in the grand final. The process will be repeated until there are four quarterly champions (no wildcards). The quarterly champions would meet in the grand final, where it is contested at the end of the season in July.

Gameplay
The show has five rounds and each player start with 100 points.

Password
The contestants will be called one at a time while the other players are in an isolation booth. There is only one answer, the password, which the contestants must identify through five clues in one minute. If they get it on the first clue, they will be awarded 50 points, second clue- forty points and so on. Once all of the clues are exhausted, the hosts would again ask the first clue, but it is still worth ten points. If the contestant does not get the password in a minute, they get zero points.
In later episodes, all of the players stay in their stations. However, a different question is given to each player.

Picture Puzzle
A mystery picture is hidden behind 9 puzzle pieces. Each puzzle piece has a question which, if answered correctly, is worth 30 points and gives a chance to solve the picture. The answers to all the puzzle pieces are clues to the picture hidden behind the puzzle pieces. If the contestant correctly guesses the mystery picture, the round shall be over immediately, and the player shall be awarded an extra 50 points.

In earlier episodes, there are 6 individual pictures related each question.

Think-Tac-Toe
Each player shall be assigned a color. In the screen are nine spaceships arranged in a 3x3 grid. Each spaceship has an assigned question, if answered correctly will give them 30 points and the spaceship will show the player's color. The player who successfully makes a tic-tac-toe (3 in a row, horizontally, vertically or diagonally) shall be awarded an extra 50 points and shall immediately end the round.

Blockbusters
Six clips will be shown to the players, all of which pertain to pop culture. The question and the answer is linked to the clip shown. Each correct answer is 30 points.

Megabytes
There are 9 computer chips on the screen. Each assigned with a category (with the 9th chip often categorized as Mathematics and the 6th chip often categorized as Art in later episodes). Seven of the nine chips are regular chips. If answered correctly shall give 30 points to the player but shall deduct 10 points if answered incorrectly. Two of the nine chips are Digital Edge Chips. The player who chose the chip shall be asked if he/she wants to play or pass the question to other players. All those who chose "play" must buzz in and answer.
If answered correctly, the chip will give an additional 60 points but if answered incorrectly shall deduct the whole 60 points (half, i.e. 30 points in later episodes). If the category chosen is Mathematics, the player has 30 seconds to solve the problem.

Finalists

Year 1 (1999-2000)

Year 2 (2000-2001)

Year 3 (2001-2002)

 Laurence Lloyd Parial - Nueva Ecija University of Science and Technology - San Isidro Campus, San Isidro - 320 point
 Renerio Salonga - Makati Hope Christian School, Makati 
 Jed Yabut - Colegio de San Juan de Letran, Manila
 Renz Jerome Caliguia - St. Vincent's Academy, Apalit, Pampanga

Year 4 (2002-2003)

 John Sithli Mendoza - Makati Science High School, Makati
 Carmen Fernandez - OB Montessori Center, Quezon City
 Miguel Karlo De Jesus - Manila Science High School, Manila
 John Carlo B. Timbol - Philippine Science High School-Diliman Campus, Quezon City

Year 5 (2003-2004)

 Joseph Sy - La Salle Greenhills, Mandaluyong
 Milli Pangilinan - St. Paul University, Quezon City
 Emir T. Hembrador - Novaliches High School, Quezon City
 Bernard Kaibigan- Paranaque Science High School, Makati

Accolades

References

External links
 

1999 Philippine television series debuts
2004 Philippine television series endings
Filipino-language television shows
GMA Network original programming
Philippine game shows
Quiz shows